The 103d Rescue Squadron (103 RQS) is a unit of the New York Air National Guard 106th Rescue Wing stationed at Francis S. Gabreski Air National Guard Base, Westhampton Beach, New York.   The squadron has no assigned aircraft; the squadron is composed of Air Force pararescue specialists (PJs) that use aircraft of the 101st and 102d Rescue Squadrons of the Wing.

Overview
Established in 2004 by the Air Force Special Operations Command as part of a re-organization of Air National Guard rescue wings which created separate squadrons for fixed-wing, helicopter and pararescue elements of the 106th Rescue Wing.

The squadron consists of pararescue and support personnel, using the HH-60G Pave Hawk helicopters of the 101st Rescue Squadron and the HC-130J Combat King II transports of the 102d Rescue Squadron.   All three squadrons are assigned to the 106th Operations Group.

History
For the history of the squadron prior to 2004, see 102nd Rescue Squadron.

References

 Rogers, B. (2006). United States Air Force Unit Designations Since 1978.

External links

Squadrons of the United States Air National Guard
Military units and formations in New York (state)
103
Military units and formations established in 2004